Marianne of My Youth (French: Marianne de ma jeunesse, German: Marianne) is a 1955 French–West German romantic drama film directed by Julien Duvivier and starring Marianne Hold, Horst Buchholz and Pierre Vaneck. It was released in separate French language and German language versions. It is based on a 1932 novel Schmerzliches Arkadien by Peter von Mendelssohn.

It was shot at the Bavaria Studios in Munich and on location at Hohenschwangau Castle and at Schloss Fuschl in Salzburg. The film's sets were designed by the art directors Jean d'Eaubonne and Willy Schatz. Marcel Ophüls was the assistant director on the production.

Plot summary

Cast
 Marianne Hold as Marianne 
 Horst Buchholz as Vincent Loringer (German version)
 Pierre Vaneck as Vincent Loringer (French version)
 Gil Vidal as Manfred (French version)
 Udo Vioff as Manfred (German version)
 Jean Yonnel as Der Freiherr 
 Friedrich Domin as Professor 
 Jean Galland as Capitaine von Brower 
 Michael Ande as Klein-Felix 
 Claude Aragon as Jan 
 Harry Hardt as Rittmeister von Brauer 
 Ady Berber as Diener 
 Serge Delmas
 Carl Simon as Gottvater 
 Bert Brandt as Toby 
 Gérard Fallec as Alexis 
 Peter Vogel as Jan 
 Isabelle Pia as Liselotte 
 Jean-François Bailly as Reinhold 
 Axel Scholtz as Franz 
 Michael Verhoeven as Alexis 
 Bernhard von der Planitz as Friedl 
 Alexander von Richthofen as Florian 
 Jacques de Féraudy as Dieu-le-Père

References

Bibliography 
 Ben McCann. Julien Duvivier. Manchester University Press, 2017.

External links 
 
 
 

1955 films
1955 romantic drama films
French romantic drama films
German romantic drama films
West German films
1950s French-language films
1950s German-language films
Films directed by Julien Duvivier
Films shot at Bavaria Studios
Films shot in Austria
Films shot in Bavaria
Films set in Bavaria
Films based on German novels
Films set in boarding schools
French multilingual films
German multilingual films
1950s multilingual films
French black-and-white films
German black-and-white films
1950s French films
1950s German films